Freeform Five is an English electronic group led by DJ, producer, and songwriter Anu Pillai.

Biography
It was his remix of Isolee’s "Beau Mot Plage" in 1999 that alerted many to this group.

The Freeform Five DJ mix albums Bisous Bisous II and Misch Masch were released in 2005 and 2006.   Over the years, Anu has remixed tracks for artist such as N*E*R*D, Brian Wilson, X-Press 2 and David Byrne, Jamie Lidell, Justin Timberlake, Felix Da Housecat and The Killers.  Freeform Five continue to perform at clubs like Fabric (London), Manumission (Ibiza), Week End (Berlin), Razz (Barcelona), Paris Paris (Paris), Lux (Lisbon) and tours in Australia, Scandinavia, North America, Mexico, Brazil and Japan.  

The 2004 studio album Strangest Things followed a series of vinyl-only releases including "Perspex Sex", "Electromagnetic" and "Eeeeaaooww". The song No More Conversations was re-released in 2007 with a new Mylo remix.  

In addition to his own work, Anu writes and produces with other artists such as Lewis Capaldi, Ladyhawke (musician), Lana Del Rey, and Little Boots. He has composed music for commercials for Apple Inc., Nike, Inc., Mercedes-Benz, SEAT, Verizon, Eurostar, and BBC amongst others. 

Along with  Roy Kerr Anu has released three EP’s on Fool's Gold Records, the label founded by A-Trak. He also releases and remixes songs by other artists on his record label Perspex Recordings.

Discography

Albums
 Strangest Things Studio Album - 2004 Atlantic Records / 2005 
 Misch Masch DJ Mix Album - 2005 Fine
Fine/Perspex Recordings (reissue)
 Bisous Bisous II DJ Mix Album - 2006 Perspex Recordings

Singles
"One Day" (1997)
"Cocoa Star" (1998)
"Hustling" (1998)
"Break Me" (2000)
"Perspex Sex" (2001)
"Electromagnetic" (2003)
"Strangest Things" (2004)
"Eeeeaaooww" (2004)
"No More Conversations" (2005)
"Muscle Car" (Mylo feat. Freeform Five) (2006) #38 UK
"No More Conversations" (reissue) (2007)
"Weltareh" Feat. Juldeh Camara (2012)
"Brandy Alexander" (2013)
"Leviathan" Feat. Róisín Murphy (2014)
"Throwing Stones" with Ali Love (2017)

Freeform reform remixes
Ayumi hamasaki  - 'alternaLegowelt - 'Disco Rout''Snow Patrol - 'Set the Fire to the Third BarWahoo - 'DamnRevl9n - 'Someone Like YouThe Killers - 'When You Were YoungJustin Timberlake - 'SexyBackThe Delays - 'ValentineJamie Lidell - 'When I Come Back AroundLindstrom - 'I Feel SpaceGabriel Ananda - 'Ihre Personliche Glucksmelodie''Alice Smith - 'Love EndeavourP!nk - 'Stupid GirlSoul Mekanik - 'Never Touch That SwitchMylo - 'Muscle CarAlter Ego - 'Beat the BushElton John - 'Are You Ready For LoveArsenal - 'Switch
Funk Lowlives - 'Time Traveller ManFutureheads - 'Decent Days and NightsBrian Wilson - 'Our PrayerFelix Da Housecat - 'Rocket RideN*E*R*D - 'LapdanceTruby Trio - 'Hi JazzWill Young  -'Switch It On''Llorca - 'Indigo BluesJ Majik - 'Love Is Not A GameMarkus Nikolai - 'BushesX-Press 2 - 'Lazy (feat. David Byrne)Annie - 'The Greatest HitIsolee - 'Brazil.comCricco Castelli - 'StreetlifeDestiny's Child - 'BootyliciousTim Hutton - 'Colours''Nitin Sawhney - 'HomelandsIsolee - 'Beau Mot Plage
''Deadmau5 - 'The Veldt'''

References

External links
 
 

English electronic musicians
English dance music groups
English house music groups
British electronic music groups
DJs from London
Remixers